Jacqueline Marie Baillie ( Barnes; born 15 January 1964) is a Scottish politician who has served as Deputy Leader of the Scottish Labour Party since 2020. She has been Member of the Scottish Parliament (MSP) for the Dumbarton constituency since 1999. She also served as acting Leader of the Scottish Labour Party in 2017 and again in 2021.

Born in British Hong Kong, Baillie was educated at St Anne's School, Windermere before studying at Cumbernauld College and the University of Strathclyde. After working in local government, she was elected at the 1999 Scottish Parliament election and served in the Scottish Executive as Minister for Social Justice under Henry McLeish. In December 2014, she was appointed as Scottish Labour Spokesperson for Finance, Constitution and Economy; later Economy, Jobs and Fair Work.

After Kezia Dugdale resigned as Leader of the Scottish Labour Party and acting leader Alex Rowley was suspended, Baillie served as acting leader until Richard Leonard was elected as Scottish Labour leader in 2017. She was sacked by Leonard as economy spokesperson in October 2018, who also replaced her in the role. After she was elected Deputy Leader of the Scottish Labour Party, Leonard reappointed Baillie to his Shadow Cabinet as Scottish Labour Spokesperson for Finance in April 2020. She again served as acting Scottish Labour leader for six weeks following Leonard's resignation in January 2021 and has been described by journalist Alex Massie as someone "who both loves to wind-up the SNP and is good at it".

Early life and career
Baillie was born on 15 January 1964 in British Hong Kong to Sophie and Frank Barnes. Her mother is Scottish and her father Portuguese. After education at the private St Anne's School, Windermere in the Lake District, she studied at Cumbernauld College and the University of Strathclyde. She went on to work as a resource centre manager at Strathkelvin District Council and a community economic development manager at East Dunbartonshire Council.

Political career

Scottish Executive: 1999–2007 
Baillie was chair of Scottish Labour in 1997. She was first elected at the inaugural election for the Scottish Parliament in May 1999. A member of the Scottish Executive, she served as Minister for Social Justice when Henry McLeish was First Minister of Scotland, during which time she was involved with the Homelessness Task Force. She was re-elected in 2003 and became a member of the Scottish Parliament's Justice 2 Committee and Public Petitions Committee. She supported the 2003 invasion of Iraq.

Opposition: 2007–2020 
In December 2007, Baillie defended Labour leader Wendy Alexander on Newsnight Scotland, during the controversy regarding alleged illegal donations to Alexander's leadership campaign.

In 2009, Baillie successfully brought into being an act of the Scottish Parliament, with the unanimous support of all MSPs, to allow for greater protection of disabled parking spaces.

Baillie has opposed minimum pricing of alcohol, being unconvinced about the overall benefits. In 2010, she stated it would not be the best way of tackling the country's alcohol-related problems but instead backed a tax-based alternative amongst other measures. The legislation was passed setting a minimum unit pricing floor price for a unit of alcohol of 50 pence per unit.

Baillie held the position of Scottish Labour Spokesperson for Health in the Shadow Cabinet of Iain Gray, retaining the post in December 2011 following the election of Johann Lamont as Gray's successor. When Lamont announced a major shakeup of the Labour frontbench team on 28 June 2013, Baillie was moved from Health to Scottish Labour Spokesperson for Social Justice and Welfare.

On 27 March 2014, Baillie stood in for Johann Lamont at First Minister's Questions while Lamont was attending the funeral of veteran Labour politician Tony Benn. She also stood in at FMQs following Lamont's resignation as Labour leader in October 2014. Baillie ruled herself out of standing in the leadership election that followed Lamont's departure, stating that she wanted a "supporting role" rather than to be Labour leader.

As a backbench MSP, Baillie campaigned for a public inquiry into a lethal outbreak of Clostridium difficile colitis at the Vale of Leven Hospital in her constituency. The inquiry into the outbreak cost £10 million, while the families were offered £1 million, something which prompted Baillie to plead Health Secretary Shona Robison for greater compensation for those affected, during a session of the Scottish Parliament in November 2014.

In December 2017, Baillie was reduced to tears when raising the concern of fire safety following the deaths of two men in the Cameron House Hotel Fire.

After Kezia Dugdale resigned as Scottish Labour leader in August 2017 and interim leader Alex Rowley was suspended, Baillie served as acting leader until Richard Leonard was elected as the new leader following the 2017 Scottish Labour leadership election. Baillie continued to serve as Scottish Labour Spokesperson for Economy, Jobs and Fair Work until October 2018 when she was sacked by Leonard, who also replaced her in the role.

Deputy Leader of the Scottish Labour Party: 2020–present 
In January 2020, Baillie announced that she would be standing as a candidate for the post of Deputy Leader of the Scottish Labour Party. On 3 April, it was announced she had won the contest by 10,311 votes to Matt Kerr's 7,528 votes. After she was elected, Leonard reappointed her to his frontbench as Scottish Labour Spokesperson for Finance. She served as acting Leader of the Scottish Labour Party since after the resignation of Leonard on 14 January 2021 and served until the election of Anas Sarwar as leader.

On 1 March 2021, Baillie was moved from shadowing Finance to Health, Social Care and Equalities.

Between 2020 and 2021, Baillie was a member of Committee on the Scottish Government Handling of Harassment Complaints that concluded that the Scottish Government's handling of harassment complaints against Alex Salmond was "seriously flawed". As a committee member, Baillie quizzed both Salmond and Nicola Sturgeon, asking the latter: "You have described these errors as catastrophic. That's a strong word, tell me why then nobody has resigned? Nobody has taken responsibility of this, because at the heart of this two women have been let down." Former BBC journalist Andrew Neil said of Baillie's questioning, "As a professional interviewer... there were many times when I thought Jackie Baillie was the only one that knew the questions to ask."

On 19 March 2021, the findings of the committee were pre-emptively leaked to the media by an MSP. Baillie backed an inquiry into the leak and said: "The leaks against the women were particularly bad, because they had the bravery to come forward to speak to the committee. It was entirely inappropriate that that information was leaked to the public domain."

In the run up to the 2021 Scottish Parliament election, former SNP Depute Leader Jim Sillars donated £2,000 to her campaign to be re-elected. “I would prefer her in the parliament to a clone on the backbenches," Sillars said. "I don’t think there is any doubt she is an asset to the parliament. My concern, in donating to Jackie Baillie, was to have a very able person in parliament."

Ballie was re-elected in May 2021 with an increased majority of 1,483, with Dumbarton becoming the only seat to have voted Labour for the entirety of the devolved era. After her victory, she told her constituents: "You want a recovery, not a referendum. You want us to prioritise your jobs, the economy, the NHS. You want us to make sure that our kids at school have all the opportunities they deserve. I pledge to you that I will do that in this next parliament."

Personal life 
Baillie married Stephen Baillie in 1982. They are now divorced. She lives in Dumbarton with her daughter. During her time as MSP, she studied for a Master of Science degree in Local Economic Development at the University of Glasgow.

Notes

References

External links 
 www.jackiebaillie.co.uk Jackie Baillie official website
 
 Jackie Baillie MSP Biography at the Labour Party website

1964 births
Living people
20th-century Scottish women politicians
Alumni of the University of Glasgow
Alumni of the University of Strathclyde
Labour MSPs
Members of the Scottish Parliament 1999–2003
Members of the Scottish Parliament 2003–2007
Members of the Scottish Parliament 2007–2011
Members of the Scottish Parliament 2011–2016
Members of the Scottish Parliament 2016–2021
Members of the Scottish Parliament 2021–2026
Ministers of the Scottish Government
Scottish people of Portuguese descent
Women members of the Scottish Government